The Ireland cricket team toured India during March 2017 to play five One Day Internationals (ODIs), three Twenty20 International (T20Is) and an ICC Intercontinental Cup match against Afghanistan. All the matches were played at the Greater Noida Sports Complex Ground, Greater Noida. Afghanistan won the T20I series 3–0 and the ODI series 3–2. Afghanistan also won the ICC Intercontinental Cup match, by an innings and 172 runs.

Squads

Ireland's Josh Little pulled out of the tour because of education commitments. Peter Chase was named as his replacement. Boyd Rankin was ruled out of Ireland's T20I matches with a back injury. He was not fit to play in the ODI series, as he was still recovering from a lower back injury, with Tim Murtagh added to the squad as cover. Rankin was later ruled out of the ODI series, with Peter Chase named as cover for him.

T20I series

1st T20I

2nd T20I

3rd T20I

ODI series

1st ODI

2nd ODI

3rd ODI

4th ODI

5th ODI

Intercontinental Cup match

References

External links
 Series home at ESPN Cricinfo

2017 in Irish cricket
2017 in Afghan cricket
International cricket competitions in 2016–17
Irish cricket tours of India
Afghan cricket tours of India